ACDS may refer to:

 Assistant Chief of the Defence Staff, a senior appointment of the British Armed Forces
 Advanced combat direction system, a centralized, automated command-and-control system
 Arlington Country Day School, a K-12 private school
 Automatically controlled digital station